Friend Humphrey (March 8, 1787 – March 15, 1854) was an American merchant and Whig state senator from New York.

Early life
He was born in Simsbury, Connecticut on March 8, 1787. He was a son of Noah Humphrey Jr. (1726–) and Margaret ( Phelps) Humphrey (–). His brother was General Chauncey Humphrey.

Career

In 1811, he moved to Albany, New York, where he engaged in the leather trade,  under the name Friend Humphrey's Son of Albany.

He was a Whig member of the New York State Senate (3rd D.) in 1840 and 1841.

He was Mayor of Albany from 1843 to 1845, and from 1849 to 1850. As mayor, he was known for the advancement of learning and "sound morals", closing the markets on Sunday.

Personal life
Humphrey married Hannah Hinman (1792–1822), a daughter of Dr. Aaron B. Hinman and Gertrude ( VanderHeyden) Hinman. Her sister Gertrude married Andrew Douw Lansing. Before her death, they were the parents of:

 Gideon Humphrey (1814–1814), who died in infancy.
 Harriet Louisa Humphrey (1819–1897), who married Clark B. Gregory of Danbury.
 Aaron Hinman Humphrey (1822–1822), who died in infancy.

In 1824, he married was Julia Ann Hoyt (1804–1851), a daughter of Mary ( Barnum) Hoyt and David Picket Hoyt, a descendant of Simon Hoyt, who landed in Massachusetts in 1628 and settled in Windsor, Connecticut, and Walker Hoyt, who was one of the first settlers of Norwalk. Through her brother James, she was an aunt to Colgate Hoyt and Wayland Hoyt. Together, they were the parents of:

 Theodore Friend Humphrey (1829–1911), a merchant and member of Friend Humphrey's Sons who married Margaret McPherson in 1854.
 James Holt Humphrey (1832–1897), who married Annie Marie Olmsted, a daughter of George Gaylord Olmsted, in 1857.
 Correl Humphrey (1839–1907), who married Helen Clarissa Millard, daughter of David Johnson Millard.
 Alexander Beebe Humphrey (1845–1919), who married Mary Morrison Charles in 1878.

He died on March 15, 1854, in Albany, leaving a good estate, and was buried at the Albany Rural Cemetery in Menands, New York.

Descendants
Through his son Theodore, he was a grandfather of Margaret Humphrey (who married William Henry Yale, of Townsend & Yale).

Residence
Around 1841, Humphrey built a two-story frame farmhouse with a gable roof and two symmetrically placed chimneys, today known as the Friend Humphrey House, in Colonie in Albany County, New York.  The transitional vernacular Greek Revival / Federal style dwelling, was listed on the National Register of Historic Places in 1985.

References
Notes

Sources

External links
Page 15: Friend Humphrey; Mayor of Albany 1834-1845, 1849-1850, Undated M. E. Grenander Department of Special Collections & Archives Science Library
List of Public Officials buried at Albany Rural Cemetery

1787 births
1854 deaths
New York (state) state senators
Mayors of Albany, New York
New York (state) Whigs
19th-century American politicians
Burials at Albany Rural Cemetery
American merchants
People from Simsbury, Connecticut
19th-century American businesspeople